Annick MacAskill is a Canadian poet from Halifax, Nova Scotia, who won the Governor General's Award for English-language poetry at the 2022 Governor General's Awards for her collection Shadow Blight.

Born in London, Ontario, and a Ph.D. graduate of the University of Western Ontario, she is an assistant professor in the Department of Languages and Cultures at Saint Mary's University. She has published two prior poetry collections, No Meeting Without Body (2018) and Murmurations (2020).

References

External links

21st-century Canadian poets
21st-century Canadian women writers
Canadian women poets
Governor General's Award-winning poets
University of Western Ontario alumni
Academic staff of the Saint Mary's University (Halifax)
Writers from Halifax, Nova Scotia
Living people
Year of birth missing (living people)